Baazi  is a 1968 Bollywood thriller film directed by Moni Bhattacharjee. It stars Dharmendra, Waheeda Rehman, Johnny Walker, Helen. The music of the film was composed by Kalyanji-Anandji.

Cast 
Dharmendra as DSP Ajay
Waheeda Rehman as Elizabeth D'Souza 
Johnny Walker as Joe
Helen as Suzy Fernandez
Shammi as Lucy Fernandez
Keshto Mukherjee as Madhav
Manmohan as Ramesh
Chand Usmani as Maya
Nazir Hussain as Father Gonsalvez

Soundtrack

External links 
 

1960s Hindi-language films
Indian thriller films
1968 films
Films scored by Kalyanji Anandji
Films directed by Moni Bhattacharjee